Syam Seethal  (Kerala, India) is an actor, film maker and screen writer in Malayalam cinema.

Early life and education
He hails from Thoniyakavu, North Paravur in Kerala state, India. He studied to be a nurse and passed the chance to work abroad to pursue his dream of working in the movies. He is married to Sreekutty Syam Seethal.

Career 
He has written the script of the movie Kinavalli. He has assisted Shibu Prabhakar in the movie Duplicate. He is also credited as assistant director of Sugeeth in all his movies.

He has also made short films. His short film Cocoon which has won the first prize in the 'Yes, I am the Change' social film making challenge in 2017.

Filmography

As director

As Screenwriter

As actor

References

External links
 

Malayalam-language writers
Living people
Year of birth missing (living people)